John Barlow  (born October 13, 1971) is a Canadian politician who has served as Member of Parliament (MP) for Foothills since 2015. A member of the Conservative Party, Barlow was first elected to the House of Commons following a by-election in 2014 and represented Macleod. Prior to his election, Barlow was a newspaper editor.

Political career 
Barlow had previously run for the Progressive Conservative Association of Alberta in Highwood during the 2012 Alberta general election, losing to Wildrose leader Danielle Smith. He ran and was elected in the riding of Macleod in a 2014 federal by-election resulting from the retirement of MP Ted Menzies.

He was re-elected after the 2015 election, in the riding of Foothills, essentially a reconfigured version of his old riding and was re-elected again on following the 2019 election.

Deputy Critic for Employment, Workforce Development, and Labour (2015-2016) 
In 2015, Barlow was appointed Deputy Critic for Employment, Workforce Development, and Labour by newly appointed interim leader of the Conservative Party, Rona Ambrose. He was also elected Vice Chair on the Standing Committee on Natural Resources.

Interprovincial Trade Critic (2016 - 2017) 
In 2016, Barlow was appointed as Interprovincial Trade Critic by Rona Ambrose, the interim Conservative leader. As critic, he focused on the campaign, #FreeTheBeer, which is intended to build public pressure for the provinces to ratify a free trade deal for Canada, specifically focused on alcohol trade between provinces.

Also in 2016, Barlow tabled his private member's bill C-351, "An Act to amend the Importation of Intoxicating Liquors Act and the Excise Act, 2001 (importation)". If passed, this legislation would:
 allow producers to sell their product directly to consumers anywhere in Canada without permission of a provincial liquor board, and
 allow a person to transport alcohol from one province to another for personal use.

Associate Shadow Minister for Agriculture and Agri-Food (2017 - 2018 
In 2018, newly elected leader of the Conservative Party, Andrew Scheer, appointed Barlow as Shadow Minister for Agriculture and Agri-Food (Associate). Simultaneously, Barlow also sat on the Standing Committee on Agriculture and Agri-Food.

Shadow Minister of Employment, Workforce Development and Labour (2018-2019) 
In 2018, Scheer appointed Barlow as Shadow Minister of Employment, Workforce Development, and Labour. He was also elected as the Vice-Chair for the Standing Committee on Human Resources, Skills and Social Development and the Status of Persons with Disabilities.

Shadow Minister for Agriculture, Agri-Food, and Food Security (2019 - 2020, 2021-present) 
In 2019, Scheer appointed Barlow as Shadow Minister for Agriculture and Agri-Food. He was elected Vice Chair of the committee on Agriculture.

In 2020, newly elected leader, Erin O'Toole replaced Barlow in this role with Lianne Rood. This likely due to the fact that Barlow endorsed Peter McKay in the Conservative Leadership election. During this time, Barlow served as a member of the standing committee on Health.

In 2021, O'Toole, appointed Barlow as Shadow Minister for Agriculture, Agri-Food, and Food Security once again for the 44th Parliament. He was again elected as Vice-Chair of the Standing committee on Agriculture.

Barlow retained this role and was reappointed under Pierre Poilievre's leadership.

Electoral record

Federal

Provincial

References

External links 

1971 births
Conservative Party of Canada MPs
Living people
Members of the House of Commons of Canada from Alberta
Politicians from Regina, Saskatchewan
Canadian newspaper editors
Canadian male journalists
21st-century Canadian politicians